The Wellington Urban Motorway, part of SH 1, is the major road into and out of Wellington, New Zealand. It is 7 km long, ranges from three to seven lanes wide, and extends from the base of the Ngauranga Gorge into the Wellington CBD.

From the Ngauranga Interchange (State Highways 1 & 2), the motorway travels south across an extra piece of reclaimed land alongside the Wairarapa and North Island Main Trunk railway lines. After passing through the suburb of Kaiwharawhara, the motorway travels across the 1335m long Thorndon overbridges, the longest bridges in the North Island, before entering the suburb of Thorndon. Shortly after it enters the Terrace Tunnel  before terminating at Vivian Street in Wellington City.

History 
Following the Second World War the National Roads Board, an arm of the Ministry of Works, began the search for better road access to Wellington. In the late 1950s they proposed a motorway between Ngauranga and Wellington's airport. The first proposal was released in 1961. Their proposal was rejected by the public for its damage to the Basin Reserve and U.S. consultants, De Leuw Cather, were called in. The alignment and scale of the motorway between Ngauranga and the Bowen Street overbridge as built very closely matches the original proposal, with the one exception that the proposed interchange at Ngaio Gorge (with on and off ramps over the railway to Kaiwharawhara) was never completed, although the stumps of a southbound on-ramp and northbound on and off ramps remain visible today broadly parallel to Kaiwharawhara railway station.  Beyond the Tinakori Road on-ramp and Hawkestone Street off-ramp going south, the motorway is a considerably scaled down concept from what was initially proposed.

The first phase of the motorway was opened in 1969 as part of State Highway 2 between Ngauranga and Aotea Quay, relieving the chronic congestion at the traffic signal controlled intersections at the bottom of Ngauranga Gorge and Ngaio Gorge where long delays and peak time queues of several kilometres occurred during the morning and evening peaks. The motorway was extended in phases as far as the Hawkestone Street off-ramp and the Tinakori Road on-ramp by 1974. The last major extension was completed in 1978, with the construction of the Terrace Tunnel and the termination of the motorway at the Ghuznee and Vivian Street intersections with Willis Street.

The original concept was for 6 lanes to proceed to Willis Street, with the existing three-lane Terrace Tunnel being the northbound route with a duplicate southbound tunnel. The current alignment of the motorway up to the Terrace offramp clearly shows how 6 lanes were curtailed to three, by using the Terrace interchange to lose a lane each way, and a third lane merging southbound towards the remaining tunnel.  About half of the southbound carriageway has been built but is unpaved, including the Bowen Street onramp which is now a walkway.  The Shell Gully/Clifton Tce carpark under the motorway, accessible from the Terrace clearly shows the pillars, and part of the carriageway (now part of the carpark) that would have carried the additional three southbound lanes to the 2nd Terrace Tunnel.  The northbound carriageway is almost complete with one exception, the Bowen Street offramp which would have been a counterclockwise loop splitting off from the Tinakori Road offramp. A section of the Tinakori Road offramp has a different type of barrier to the rest of the offramp, this shows where it would have been.

Funding for the second tunnel was indefinitely shelved in the 1970s due to fiscal pressures on government, and the beginning of far greater scrutiny of the quality of highway expenditure.  It was clear that until the Wellington Urban Motorway was connected to State Highway 1 at Ngauranga Gorge, that a single Terrace Tunnel would be adequate for the traffic demands of the 1970s. With lack of future thinking, the tunnel is now a congestion blackspot in morning rush hour.

The Ngauranga Interchange connecting State Highway 1 opened in 1984, removing the State Highway designation from the Hutt Road south of Ngauranga, and making the Wellington Urban Motorway between Ngauranga and Aotea Quay both State Highway 1 and 2.  While the Ngauranga Interchange relieved the severe congestion experienced at the traffic light controlled intersection at Ngauranga, it did double the usage of the rest of the motorway, generating peak time congestion at the end of the motorway, and in the morning peaks with merging traffic from the Hutt.

Meanwhile, the original plans to extend the motorway beyond Willis Street had been significantly reviewed, with a new plan for an "arterial extension" at a 70 km/h standard proposed along the motorway alignment towards the existing Mount Victoria Tunnel (the original full motorway plan had been scrapped, as it would've meant the destruction of the Basin Reserve, and an unaffordable duplicate Mount Victoria Tunnel).  That plan was shelved in 1993 because of funding constraints at the time.  Transit New Zealand prioritised a three-stage approach to addressing the traffic issues between the Terrace Tunnel and the Mt Victoria Tunnel:

Stage 1.  Conversion of Buckle St to one-way westbound, and Vivian St from Taranaki Street to Cambridge Terrace to one-way eastbound operation. This was seen as a short-term measure to prepare for Stage 2.

Stage 2.  Widening of Arthur Street and extension towards Victoria and Willis St to a new on-ramp underneath Vivian St.  Closure of the Vivian St onramp and construction of a new off-ramp at Vivian St. Vivian St would be converted to one-way eastbound operation between Willis St and Taranaki St. The Ghuznee St offramp would be closed and Ghuznee St reverted to two-way operation.  Stage 2 was seen as a medium-term measure, providing sufficient relief for ten years before consideration of Stage 3.

Stage 3. Construction of an almost entirely cut-and-cover grade separated arterial tunnel highway from the Terrace Tunnel to Mt Victoria Tunnel, resembling the 1980s "arterial extension" proposal. This was seen as the long-term proposal.

Between 1995 and 2002,  Transit New Zealand pursued the Stage 2 proposal, this became known as the Wellington Inner City Bypass. Given the appeals and opposition to Stage 2 from some groups, Transit quietly shelved further work on Stage 3 as it focused on completing the one-way system across Te Aro.

Until 2006 the northbound motorway started at the Vivian Street onramp. On 28 December 2006 this onramp was closed, with a new northbound onramp at Karo Drive as part of the Wellington Inner City Bypass.

Until 2007 the southbound motorway terminated at the Ghuznee Street offramp. On 25 March 2007 this offramp was closed, and traffic diverted to a new Vivian Street offramp along the line of the former onramp.

The Motorway is the subject of the ongoing Ngauranga to Airport Strategic Study, which is investigating Wellington City's future transport growth needs.

Interchanges

See also

List of motorways and expressways in New Zealand

References

Streets in Wellington City
Motorways in New Zealand
Transport in Wellington
Wellington City
State Highway 1 (New Zealand)
Wellington Harbour